Ritchie is a small town situated  south of Kimberley on the north bank of the Riet River in the Northern Cape province of South Africa. The town, with a population of approximately 15,000, is in the Sol Plaatje Local Municipality, which forms part of the Frances Baard District Municipality.

Demographics
According to the 2011 census, the town of Ritchie proper has a population of 7,610, while the adjacent township of Motswedimosa has a population of 7,240, giving the urban area a population of 14,850. Of this population 50.9% described themselves as "Black African", 45.4% as "Coloured" and 2.1% as "White". 87.6% spoke Afrikaans as their home language, 6.3% spoke Tswana, 1.8% spoke Xhosa and 1.6% spoke Sotho.

References

Populated places in the Sol Plaatje Local Municipality